is a Japanese football player for Tokyo Verdy.

National team career
In August 2007, Hanato was elected Japan U-17 national team for 2007 U-17 World Cup. He played all 3 matches.

Club statistics
Updated to 19 July 2022.

Awards and honours
Shonan Bellmare
J2 League: 2017
Yokohama F. Marinos
Emperor's Cup: 2013

Japan
AFC U-17 Championship: 2006

References

External links

Profile at Shonan Bellmare 

1990 births
Living people
Association football people from Kanagawa Prefecture
Japanese footballers
Japan youth international footballers
J1 League players
J2 League players
Yokohama F. Marinos players
Giravanz Kitakyushu players
Shonan Bellmare players
Tokyo Verdy players
Association football forwards